The earliest modern contact between Mongolia and the Republic of Singapore started in 1950, and both countries established diplomatic relations in 1970.

History 
Although there is a reference to "the craftsmen of the Lion City" ("Арслан хотын урчуудаараа хийлгэсэн юмаа хө""Arslan hotyn urchuudaaraa hiilgesen yumaa hu") in Aduuchin (Адуучин "Horseman"), a Mongolian folk song (origin unknown), the first dated interaction was in 1320, when envoys of the Yuan Dynasty (part of the Mongol Empire) were sent to obtain elephants from Long Ya Men  (龍牙門, Dragon's Teeth Gate, the entrance to present-day Keppel Harbour in Singapore); the people of Long Ya Men subsequently visited the court of Yesün Temür in 1325 with a tribute and trade mission.

The earliest documented contact between modern Singapore and Mongolia started in 1950, when nine Mongolian pilgrims arrived at Singapore in a ship called the Automedon from Jeddah. In 1960s, the trade between Singapore and Mongolia was restricted due to the anti-communist policies of Singapore.

Singapore and Mongolia established diplomatic relations on June 11, 1970. Tsevengombyn Demiddagva, the Ambassador of Mongolia to India, was appointed as the first non-resident Ambassador of Mongolia to Singapore two years later. In 1990, B. Sharavsambuu, the Vice Chairman of the Councils of Minister of Mongolia, visited Singapore, marking the first official contact between the two countries. In 1992, Mongolia set up a trade representative office in Singapore; a consul, Haidav Gungaajav, was resident in Singapore at 100 St Patrick Rd during the late 1990s. A consulate-general was set up in Singapore ten years later, under Resolution No.92 of the Parliament of Mongolia in 2001, whereby the Trade Representative Office of Mongolia was reorganized as a Consulate General. In 2008, the consulate-general became an embassy and Gansukh Purevjav became the first resident ambassador of Mongolia to Singapore, Delgermaa Banzragch in 2012, and in 2015 T.Lkhagvadorj (who also served as Dean of the Diplomatic Corps in 2020). The current Ambassador of Mongolia to Singapore is S.Enkhbayar (since December 2021).

In 1995, Puntsagiin Jasrai, the Prime Minister of Mongolia, visited Singapore, the first Prime Minister of Mongolia to do so. Further Prime Ministerial visits were by Nambaryn Enkhbayar in October 2002, then-Prime Minister Ts.Elbegdorj in 2005, S.Batbold in 2011 and Oyun-Erdene Luvsannamsrai in July 2022. In 2001, Natsagiin Bagabandi was the first President of Mongolia to visit Singapore. The President of Mongolia, Tsakhiagiin Elbegdorj, made a state visit to Singapore in November 2013.

Other high-level visits to Singapore took place in 2019 and 2020, by the Mongolian Minister for Foreign Affairs D. Tsogtbaatar (5-8 June 2019), and the Speaker of the Parliament of Mongolia, G. Zandanshatar, in January 2020.

In December 1994, the Government of the Republic of Singapore accredited its Ambassador to the Republic of Korea as a non-Resident Ambassador to Mongolia. The Ambassador of the Republic of Singapore, Pang Eng Fong, presented his letter of credence to the Mongolian President in May 1995. BG Michael Teo Eng Cheng was appointed the non-resident Ambassador of Singapore to Mongolia from 1997 until 2001, followed by Calvin Eu Mun Hoo in July 2002, Chua Thai Keong from 2006 to 2010, Peter Tan Hai Chuan in June 2011  and Yip Wei Kiat on 7 July 2015. The current non-resident Ambassador of Singapore to Mongolia is Eric Teo Boon Hee (from November 2019).

In 2016, Lee Hsien Loong, the Prime Minister of Singapore visited Mongolia, the first Prime Minister of Singapore to do so. When he was welcomed by his Mongolian counterpart Jargaltulgyn Erdenebat, PM Lee stated that he would open new areas of cooperation between the two countries and enhance bilateral cooperation. Both leaders of the two countries agreed the visit "opened a new chapter" for bilateral relations between the two countries.

Trade relations 
According to the data from The Observatory of Economic Complexity, the exported values from Singapore to Mongolia were between 10 and 20 million US dollars. The exported value started increasing in 2003, reaching a peak of 70 million US dollars in 2013, before falling between 2009 and 2012. Singapore's main export product to Mongolia was motors. The proportion of food in exported products from Singapore to Mongolia started increasing in 2002.

The exported values from Mongolia to Singapore were below 2 million US dollars between 1995 and 2003, in 2005, and between 2007 and 2012. In 2004, gold was exported to Singapore, making a high of the exported value, at 20 million US dollars. The exported value increased again in 2012 with a rise in the export proportion of transportation utilities and motors.

Singapore and Mongolia signed agreements among air services, promotion and reciprocal protection of investments and avoidance of double taxation in 1993, 1995 and 2003, separately. Direct flights between Singapore and Ulaanbaatar (twice a week, with a stopover in Beijing) began in September 2014, but ended about a year later. Mongolia provided 14-day visa-free access to Singapore passport holders, while Singapore provides 30-day visa-free access to Mongolian passport holders. During his visit to Mongolia in 2016, Lee Hsien Loong, the Prime Minister of Singapore, suggested the Mongolian government extend visa-free access to Mongolia for Singapore passport holders up to 30 days. This was granted effective June 2017.

On November 25, 2015, the Embassy of Mongolia in Singapore organized "Mongolia – Singapore Midas Touch Xchange Business Forum 2015" at The Fullerton Hotel Singapore to celebrate the 45th anniversary of the establishment of diplomatic relations between Mongolia and Singapore and the 91st anniversary of the implementation of the first Mongolian constitution and the Declaration of Independence of Mongolia.

Cultural relations 
In 2009, the Temasek Foundation of Singapore set aside 364,000 US dollars for cooperation with the Nanyang Polytechnic of Singapore and the National Productivity and Development Centre of Mongolia to provide training programmes for 90 Mongolian officials, specialists from the government, non-governmental institutions and private enterprises. Singapore also provided training programmes and study visits to Mongolian officials in public housing, Central Provident Fund system and technical and vocational education. As of 2022, 1600  Mongolian officials have participated in the Singapore Cooperation Programme in various fields such as English language, information technology, finance and management, urban and environmental management and tourism etc.  Singapore and Mongolia signed a memorandum in energy cooperation in 2016.

Mongolian culture and arts have had a growing presence in Singapore since the 1990s, including singers and bands (Khar Sarnai being one of the earliest), visual artists (both group  and solo  exhibitions), and a contortion group. Singapore musicians and bands have performed at Mongolian jazz festivals and other music events such as Playtime.

To commemorate 50 years of diplomatic relations between Singapore and Mongolia, SingPost and Mongol Post launched a joint stamp issue in November 2020. Previous philatelic relations occurred in 1994, when Mongol Post issued stamps for the International Stamp Exhibition held in Singapore.

Around 270 Mongolians live in Singapore; 7,196 Mongolians visited Singapore in 2017-2018. Around 20 Singaporeans live in Mongolia; 4,804 Singaporeans visited Mongolia in 2017-2018. A Singaporean living in Mongolia established a non-governmental organization in order to improve Mongolians' lives.

See also 
 Foreign relations of Singapore
 Foreign relations of Mongolia

References

External links 
 Embassy of Mongolia, Singapore

Bilateral relations of Singapore
Singapore